Hatitia is a genus of South American anyphaenid sac spiders first described by Antônio Brescovit in 1997.

Species
 it contains six species:
Hatitia canchaque Brescovit, 1997 – Ecuador, Peru
Hatitia defonlonguei (Berland, 1913) – Ecuador
Hatitia perrieri (Berland, 1913) – Ecuador
Hatitia riveti (Berland, 1913) – Ecuador
Hatitia sericea (L. Koch, 1866) – Colombia
Hatitia yhuaia Brescovit, 1997 – Peru

References

Anyphaenidae
Araneomorphae genera
Spiders of South America
Taxa named by Antônio Brescovit